Ballantrae is a community in Carrick, South Ayrshire, Scotland. The name probably comes from the Scottish Gaelic Baile na Tràgha, meaning the "town by the beach". Ballantrae has a primary school. The beach consists of shingle and sand and offers views of Ailsa Craig, the Arran and Kintyre.

History

In June 1673, while holding a conventicle at Knockdow near Ballantrae, Alexander Peden, was captured by Major William Cockburn, and condemned by the Privy Council to four years and three months' imprisonment on the Bass Rock and a further fifteen months in the Edinburgh Tolbooth.
James Mackay, 1st Earl of Inchcape of Strathnaver, was the owner of Glenapp Castle on the eponymous estate, and flowering shrubs spell out the name of his daughter on the opposite side of the glen. This daughter, Elsie Mackay, perished in an attempt to become the first female transatlantic aviator in 1928. She is commemorated by a stained glass window in the chancel of the church at Ballantrae. The Glenapp Castle has been converted into a luxury hotel.  The Ballantrae Windmill of 1696 on Mill Hill above the raised beach cliffs is one of the oldest industrial buildings in Scotland.

The caves at Bennane Head and Balcreuchan Port are nearby. Both are associated with the legend of Sawney Bean.

Literature 
When he was in the Samoan Islands writing his novel 'The Master of Ballantrae', Robert Louis Stevenson remembered and borrowed the name of the town he had visited on walking tours, but the setting for the novel is not that town.

Geology
Ballantrae has lent its name to a subdivision of the Arenig group, which is the name applied to the lowest stage of the Ordovician System.

People from Ballantrae
 William Hunter (1861–1937), surgeon
 Struan Stevenson (1948–), former Tory MEP

External links
 Ballantrae Website - information on the village of Ballantrae, South Ayrshire

References

Villages in Carrick, Scotland